Field hockey at the 2006 Commonwealth Games took place between 16 March and 24 March for women and for men, between 17 March and 24 March. Both competitions consisted of a round robin stage of two groups of five with the winners and runners-up of each group qualifying for the semifinals.

All matches were played at the State Netball and Hockey Centre in the Parkville area of Melbourne.

Men's tournament

Medallists

Men's team rosters

Women's tournament

Medallists

Women's team rosters

References

 
2006 Commonwealth Games events
Commonwealth Games
2006
2006
2006 in Australian field hockey